Hesperilla crypsargyra, also known as the silvered skipper or silver hedge-skipper, is a species of butterfly in the family Hesperiidae. It is found in the Australian states of New South Wales, Queensland and Victoria.

The wingspan is about 20 mm.

The larvae feed on various sword grasses, including Gahnia sieberiana, Gahnia grandis and Gahnia microstachya.

Subspecies
Hesperilla crypsargyra crypsargyra  (Meyrick, 1888)  (New South Wales, Victoria)
Hesperilla crypsargyra hopsoni Waterhouse, 1927 (New South Wales, Queensland)

References

External links
 Australian Insects
 Australian Faunal Directory

Trapezitinae
Fauna of New South Wales
Insects of Queensland
Fauna of Victoria (Australia)
Butterflies described in 1888
Butterflies of Australia
Taxa named by Edward Meyrick